The Camp Clarke Bridge Site in Morrill County, Nebraska near Bridgeport dates from 1875.  Also known as 25 MO 68, it was listed on the National Register of Historic Places in 1974.

It is the location of a toll bridge built in 1875 by entrepreneur Henry T. Clarke, who provided a crossing over the North Platte River for what became the Sidney-Black Hills Trail.  The trail provided access for freight wagons, stagecoaches and other vehicles headed to and from the Dakota gold fields, from the Union Pacific railway trailhead at Fort Sidney, Nebraska.

It is about 9 miles east from Chimney Rock and three miles west of Bridgeport, Nebraska. Historic photos show a wooden truss bridge built on pilings in the soft ground of the river. It was "a massive structure... Two thousand feet in length with a solid six to one truss span."  It was the only reliable crossing between Fort Laramie and North Platte, Nebraska.

At the time of the NRHP listing in 1974, the North Platte no longer flowed through the bridge location, but was rather slightly to the north.

See also
Greenwood Stage Station, also on the Sidney-Black Hills Trail, also NRHP-listed

References

Archaeological sites on the National Register of Historic Places in Nebraska
Bridges completed in 1875
Buildings and structures in Morrill County, Nebraska
Road bridges in Nebraska
Former toll bridges in Nebraska
National Register of Historic Places in Morrill County, Nebraska
Truss bridges in the United States
Wooden bridges in the United States